Clivina elegans is a ground beetle species in the genus Clivina found in Australia.

References

External links 
 Clivina elegans at Fauna Europaea
 Clivina elegans at carabidae.org

elegans
Beetles described in 1863
Beetles of Australia